Sunset Jones is a 1921 American silent Western film directed by George L. Cox and starring Charles Clary, James Gordon, and Irene Rich.

Cast
 Charles Clary as Sunset Jones 
 James Gordon as David Rand 
 Irene Rich as Marion Rand 
 Kathleen O'Connor as Molly Forbes

References

Bibliography
 Munden, Kenneth White. The American Film Institute Catalog of Motion Pictures Produced in the United States, Part 1. University of California Press, 1997.

External links

 

1921 films
1921 Western (genre) films
Films directed by George L. Cox
Pathé Exchange films
American black-and-white films
Silent American Western (genre) films
1920s English-language films
1920s American films